Cnemaspis monachorum, also known commonly as the monks' rock gecko, is a species of lizard in the family Gekkonidae. The species is endemic to Malaysia.

Etymology
The specific name, monachorum (masculine, genitive, plural), is in honor of the monks at Wat Wanarum, Peninsular Malaysia.

Geographic range
C. monachorum is found in Pulau Langkawi, Kedah, Peninsular Malaysia.

Description
C. monachorum is a small species. Males are even smaller, with a maximum SVL of only .

References

Further reading
Grismer, L. Lee; Ahmad, Norhayati; Chan Kin Onn; Belabut, Diacus; Muin, M.A.; Wood, Perry L., Jr.; Grismer, Jesse L. (2009). "Two new diminutive species of Cnemaspis Strauch 1887 (Squamata: Gekkonidae) from Peninsular Malaysia". Zootaxa 2019: 40–56. (Cnemaspis monachorum, new species).
Grismer, L. Lee; Quah, Evan S. H. (2019). "An updated and annotated checklist of the lizards of Peninsular Malaysia, Singapore, and their adjacent archipelagos". Zootaxa 4545 (2): 230–248.

Cnemaspis
Reptiles described in 2009